Kalateh-ye Mazar (also Romanized as Kalāteh-ye Mazār and Kalāteh Mazār; also known as Mazār) is a village in Zohan Rural District, Zohan District, Zirkuh County, South Khorasan Province, Iran. At the 2006 census, its population was 377, in 102 families.

References 

Populated places in Zirkuh County